Anthene hodsoni, the Hodson's hairtail, is a butterfly in the family Lycaenidae. It is found in Ethiopia, Sudan, Uganda and Kenya. The habitat consists of savanna.

The larvae feed on Acacia drepanolobium from within galls. The larvae are associated with ants of the genus Pheidole.

Subspecies
Anthene hodsoni hodsoni (south-western Ethiopia, Sudan, Uganda, north-western Kenya)
Anthene hodsoni usamba (Talbot, 1937) (central Kenya)

References

Butterflies described in 1935
Anthene